The Florida Armed Occupation Act of 1842 was passed as an incentive to populate Florida.
    
The Act granted 160 acres (0.6 km2) of unsettled land south of the line separating townships 9 and 10 South
(an east–west line about three miles (5 km) north of Palatka and about ten miles (16 km) south of Newnansville) to any head of a family as long he satisfied the following conditions:

be a resident of Florida and not having 160 acres (0.6 km2) of land in Florida when asking for the permit;
get a permit from the Lands Office;
he or his heirs reside for five consecutive years on the grant ;
clear, enclose and cultivate  of land during the first year;
build a house on the lot during the first year;
the land should be two or more miles away from a garrisoned military post.

The total land to be granted should not be more than 200,000 acres (800 km2) under the act.

See also 

 Frederick Weedon – the first person to receive a permit for land under the Act
 Mosquito County

References

Literature
 James W. Covington, “The Armed Occupation Act of 1842.” Florida Historical Quarterly 40, no. 1 (1961): 41–52.

 Laurel Clark Shire, The Threshold of Manifest Destiny: Gender and National Expansion in Florida. Philadelphia, PA: University of Pennsylvania Press, 2016.

 Laurel Clark Shire, “Turning Sufferers into Settlers: Gender, Welfare, and National Expansion in Frontier Florida.” Journal of the Early Republic 33, no. 3 (2013): 489–521.

 Joe Knetsch and Paul S. George, “A Problematical Law: The Armed Occupation Act of 1842 and Its Impact on Southeast Florida.” Tequesta 53 (1993): 63–80.

 Joe Knetsch and Paul S. George, “Staking a Claim in Early Miami.” South Florida History Magazine, no. 1 (Winter 1990): 18–20.

 Michael E. Welsh, “Legislating a Homestead Bill: Thomas Hart Benton and the Second Seminole War.” Florida Historical Quarterly 57, no. 2 (1978): 157–72.

 Julius Wilm, Settlers as Conquerors: Free Land Policy in Antebellum America. Stuttgart, Germany: Franz Steiner Verlag, 2018.

1842 in American law
United States federal public land legislation
Pre-statehood history of Florida
Settlement schemes in the United States
Florida Territory